The 2003 Women's African Nations Championship was the 11th edition of the Women's African Volleyball Championship organised by Africa's governing volleyball body, the Confédération Africaine de Volleyball. It was held in Nairobi, Kenya, from 16 to 23 August 2003.

Egypt won the championship defeating Kenya in the final, while Cameroon defeated Algeria to finish third.

Competing nations
The following national teams have confirmed participation:

Venue

Format
The tournament is played in two stages. In the first stage, the participants are divided in two groups. A single round-robin format is played within each group to determine the teams' group position (as per procedure below). 

The second stage is a knockout format, the top two teams in each group advance to the semifinals, third placed teams in each group play for 5th-6th and fourth placed teams in each group play for 7th-8th place. Winners of the semifinals play the final, while losers play for third and fourth places.

Pool standing procedure
 Match points (win = 2 points, loss = 1 point)
 Number of matches won
 Sets ratio
 Points ratio

Pool composition
The drawing of lots was held in Nairobi, Kenya on 15 August 2003.

Group stage

Group A

|}

|}

Group B

|}

|}

Final round

Semifinals

|}

7th place match

|}

5th place match

|}

3rd place match

|}

Final

|}

Final standing
Tournament winner qualify for the 2003 FIVB World Cup.

Source: CAVB.

Awards

MVP
 Tahani Toson
Best Setter
 Rose Beleng À Ngon
Best Receiver
 Mercy Wesutila
Best Defender
 Sara Talaat Aly

Best Scorer
 Tahani Toson
Best Attacker
 Dorcas Nakhomicha Ndasaba
Best Blocker
 Lydia Oulmou
Best Server
 Arabia Rafrafi

Source: CAVB.

References
CAVB group stage (first and second rounds) results.
CAVB semifinals, 5th and 7th places matches report.
CAVB final, 3rd, 5th and 7th places matches report.

External links
 Results

2003 Women
African championship, women
Women's African Volleyball Championship
2003 in Kenyan sport
International volleyball competitions hosted by Kenya